Sycamore Township is one of the thirteen townships of Wyandot County, Ohio, United States. The 2010 census found 1,600 people in the township, 861 of whom lived in the village of Sycamore.

Geography
Located in the northeastern corner of the county, it borders the following townships:
Eden Township, Seneca County - north
Texas Township, Crawford County - east
Tod Township, Crawford County - southeast corner
Eden Township - south
Tymochtee Township - west
Seneca Township, Seneca County - northwest corner

The village of Sycamore is located in western Sycamore Township.

Name and history
Statewide, the only other Sycamore Township is located in Hamilton County.

Government
The township is governed by a three-member board of trustees, who are elected in November of odd-numbered years to a four-year term beginning on the following January 1. Two are elected in the year after the presidential election and one is elected in the year before it. There is also an elected township fiscal officer, who serves a four-year term beginning on April 1 of the year after the election, which is held in November of the year before the presidential election. Vacancies in the fiscal officership or on the board of trustees are filled by the remaining trustees.

References

External links
County website

Townships in Wyandot County, Ohio
Townships in Ohio